Timothy Richard Fox (born November 1, 1953) is a former American football safety. He played in the National Football League (NFL) for the New England Patriots, San Diego Chargers and the Los Angeles Rams from 1976 to 1986.

Fox was born in Canton, Ohio, where he played football at Glenwood High School. He continued to play football while attending Ohio State University, and was a co-captain his senior year along with the only two time Heisman Trophy winner Archie Griffin under the great coach Woody Hayes. He was selected in the 1st round (21st overall) in the 1976 NFL Draft by the Patriots. He was selected to the Pro Bowl in 1981.  Fox remained in Foxboro, Massachusetts after he retired in 1987 for 12 years until 1999 when he decided to make Westwood, Massachusetts his new home. Tim currently resides in Hull, Massachusetts and Marco Island, Florida. Fox worked for R.R. Donnelley & Sons and was most recently Sales Director for the New England region prior to his retirement. He and his wife Deborah have two daughters, Haley and Landin, and one son, Christopher, as well as four grandchildren.

In 2016, Fox described himself and his declining cognitive abilities, as "...a living, breathing petri dish for CTE research.”

References 

1953 births
Living people
All-American college football players
American Conference Pro Bowl players
American football safeties
Los Angeles Rams players
New England Patriots players
Ohio State Buckeyes football players
People from Hull, Massachusetts
Players of American football from Canton, Ohio
San Diego Chargers players
Sportspeople from Plymouth County, Massachusetts